Reginald Joseph "Hooley" Smith (January 7, 1903 – August 24, 1963) was a Canadian professional ice hockey forward who played for the Ottawa Senators, Montreal Maroons, Boston Bruins and New York Americans between 1924 and 1941. He won the Stanley Cup twice, with Ottawa and Montreal. Prior to turning professional he played at the 1924 Winter Olympics, winning a gold medal with the Canadian national team. He is possibly the first National Hockey League player to wear a helmet.

Playing career
Born in Toronto, Ontario, Smith played amateur hockey for the Toronto Granites team that won the Allan Cup and a gold medal for Canada at the 1924 Winter Olympics. He had an outstanding Olympic ice hockey tournament, scoring 17 goals and 33 points in five games.

He started his professional career with the 'Super Six' of the Ottawa Senators the following winter. In his first season with Ottawa, he received a head injury. When he returned to play he wore a jockey-type helmet to protect his head. In 1926–27, Ottawa won the Stanley Cup against Boston. It was the last game that Smith played with Ottawa. After attacking Harry Oliver in the final game of that series, he was suspended for a month of the following year. Ottawa had lost money during the season despite winning the Stanley Cup and the team sold Smith to the Montreal Maroons.

As a member of the Maroons, Hooley would be a part of one of the best early forward lines in NHL history, the "S line". He, Nels Stewart and Albert "Babe" Siebert made up the famous line that was feared throughout the NHL. Smith was named captain of the Maroons and was their captain when the team won its final Stanley Cup in 1935.

By the mid-1930s the Maroons were experiencing financial difficulties and he was sold to Boston, where he only played for one season. He then was sold to the New York Americans. Starting with 1938–39, he played defence for the Americans until 1941 after which he retired.  From the 1940 season, he held the NHL mark for career games played, which he held until 1944, when surpassed by Dit Clapper.

Later life
Hooley Smith died as a result of a heart attack on August 24, 1963 at St. Mary's Hospital in Montreal. At the time of his death, he was the last surviving member of the famed "S" line. He was inducted into the Hockey Hall of Fame in 1972.

Career statistics

Regular season and playoffs

International

Transactions

 October 31, 1924 – Signed as a free agent by Ottawa Senators.
 October 7, 1927 – Traded to Montreal Maroons by Ottawa for Harry Broadbent and $22,500.
 October 26, 1936 – Traded to Boston by Mtl. Maroons for cash and future considerations (Gerry Shannon, December 4, 1936).
 November 5, 1937 – Traded to New York Americans by Boston for cash.
Source: Legends of Hockey Statistics for Hooley Smith

References

External links
 

1903 births
1963 deaths
Boston Bruins players
Canadian ice hockey forwards
Hockey Hall of Fame inductees
Ice hockey players at the 1924 Winter Olympics
Medalists at the 1924 Winter Olympics
Montreal Maroons players
New York Americans players
Olympic gold medalists for Canada
Olympic ice hockey players of Canada
Olympic medalists in ice hockey
Ontario Hockey Association Senior A League (1890–1979) players
Ottawa Senators (1917) players
Ice hockey people from Toronto
Stanley Cup champions